Camden High School is located in Camden, South Carolina, and is one of three high schools in the Kershaw County School District. It is the second largest high school. The school has approximately 980 students. It is home of the Camden Bulldogs.

In 2004, the district started its iCan laptop program. Since then, every incoming freshmen has received a computing device to be used for their next four years at the school.

Campus 

In 1992, Camden High School moved from Laurens Street, which became Camden Middle School, to its present location on Ehrenclou Drive.

Athletics

The school has won the following state championships:
1990 AAA Football
2001 AAA Football
2009 AAA Boys' Basketball
2023 AAA Girls' Basketball

Notable alumni
 Thomas Austin (American football), former professional American football player; coach at Clemson University
 Mel Byars, American historian; author, The Design Encyclopedia, The Museum of Modern Art; recipient, Besterman McColvin gold medal
 Shawn Elliott, head football coach for Georgia State
 Bobby Engram, former professional American football player, current offensive coordinator for the Wisconsin Badgers
 Ike Hampton, former professional baseball player
 Vonnie Holliday, former professional American football player
 Michael Kohn, professional baseball player
 Lois Rhame West (1939), former First Lady of South Carolina (1971–1975), first woman to chair the Muscular Dystrophy Association.
 Samuel E. Wright, actor, voice actor, and singer; known for voicing Sebastian in The Little Mermaid.

References

External links 
Camden High School homepage
Camden High School Fan athletic site

Public high schools in South Carolina
Schools in Kershaw County, South Carolina
Camden, South Carolina